Vitimbi is a Kenyan television comedy show that premiered in 1985 on Kenya Broadcasting Corporation, then known as Voice of Kenya. It revolves the family of Mzee Ojwang and her wife Mama Kayai as they experience challenges of managing a restaurant.

Overview
The term 'vitimbi' can be translated to mean 'machinations' or 'intrigues' or 'drama' in Kiswahili. The popular actors and actresses are the late Benson Wanjau alias Mzee Ojwang Hatari, Mary Khavere alias Mama Kayai as Mzee Ojwang's wife, Davis Mwabili alias Mwala and Julius Nyambegere alias Mogaka.  Over the years, the show has won numerous awards for its ability to entertain and at the same time educate Kenyans on various social issues. Mzee Jomo Kenyatta, Kenya's first president, and Daniel Toroitich arap Moi, Kenya's second president, were particularly fond of the show and the actors were always given an opportunity to perform during national celebrations. The show was controversially ended in 2014 after airing for more than 30 years because the actors were deemed "too old". The plan was initially to revamp the show by bringing in new and younger actors who would carry the names of older actors such as Mzee Ojwang and Mama Kayai. However, the show was pulled off air altogether and no longer airs on the national broadcaster.

References

External links

Kenyan television shows
Television shows set in Nairobi
Kenya Broadcasting Corporation original programming